Sean Jordan, better known by his stage name Wordburglar, is a Canadian alternative hip hop artist from Halifax, Nova Scotia, now based in Toronto. His style is best described as upbeat and charismatic with an emphasis on wordplay and humour. He primarily works with his crews Backburner and Props Dept for all aspects of his music creation, including production, cuts, mixing, mastering and guest vocals.

Biography
Born as Sean Jordan, SJ the Wordburglar began his rap career as a member of The Dregs of Society using the name SJ or "Essjae". Their biggest hit was a song called "Stuart" about one of their friends. It appears as a bonus cut on Wordburglar's self-titled debut. After the Dregs broke up, Wordburglar started a solo career as SJ, adopting the additional "the Wordburglar" upon teaming up with Beatmason for his first major single, "Wordburglar." The song was central to his self-released debut (Backburner) and was also included on the compilation Bassments of Badmen: Volume 2 (Hand'Solo Records) later that year. The song was also made into an animated video, which is featured on Jasmatuph's Preserving Efforts DVD video collection, and has been remixed by a number of different producers. Signing to Hand'Solo Records, Wordburglar followed his debut CD with a vinyl EP that collected songs from that album and his at-that-time upcoming Burglaritis with a few exclusives in 2005 and Burglaritis in 2006. Both the vinyl EP and Burglaritis feature the song "Breeze," a duet with Quannum Projects member Pigeon John.

Burglaritis and studio releases

Following Burglaritis, Wordburglar released "Burgie’s Basement" initially as a tour-only CD and eventually through Toronto Hip-Hop Label URBNET in 2009. After completing the group album "Heatwave" with the Backburner Crew in 2011 and extensive touring, Wordburglar released his 3rd official "studio album" simply titled "3rdburglar" in 2012. In 2013 he started his own independent label for his solo work and released "Welcome To Cobra Island" (2013), "Rapplicable Skills" (2015), "Rhyme Your Business" (2018) and "SpaceVerse" (2019). "Burgonomic" (2022) is Wordburglar's most recent album, internationally released Summer 2022.

In 2009 Wordburglar co-founded the long-running “$5 Rap Show" in Toronto with long-time music partner More Or Les. He has released a series of limited edition vinyl singles with Halifax's Black Buffalo Records and continues to work with underground affiliates Hand Solo Records, URBNET, Backburner Crew and The Props Dept.

Collaborations

In addition to releasing three full-length albums with Backburner Crew ("Heatwave", "Eclipse" & "Continuum"), Wordburglar has collaborated with fellow Halifax Hip-Hop artists Jorun Bombay and Buck 65 as well as Moka Only and American rappers Mega Ran, Riddlore, Esoteric of Czarface, Kool Keith and the rock band The Cybertronic Spree.

Work outside of hip hop

Wordburglar is a writer and actor. He is the voice of the Transformer STARSCOPE on the animated series TRANSFORMERS: BOTBOTS

Wordburglar is also a comic book creator of the action-comedy series Snakor's Pizza and The Last Paper Route under his given name.

Discography

Studio albums 

SJ the Wordburglar (2003)
Burglaritis (2006)
Burgie's Basement (2009)
3rdburglar (2012)
Welcome to Cobra Island (2013)
Rapplicable Skills (2015)
Rhyme Your Business (2018)
SpaceVerse (2019)
Burgonomic (2022)

Ep's 

If It Rhymes It's Real EP (2017)
The Mos Eisley Rap Show EP (2019)

Vinyl Singles 

Channel Halifax b/w Cream of Wheat (2017)
NARC Hi-Score b/w Yobosayo (2018)
Damage Control b/w Space Defense Team featuring Esoteric of Czarface, Kool Keith & Mega Ran (2019)

References

External links
Official Wordburglar website
Hand'Solo Records

21st-century Canadian rappers
Canadian male rappers
Musicians from Halifax, Nova Scotia
Living people
Year of birth missing (living people)
21st-century Canadian male musicians